The women's 100 metre breaststroke event at the 2002 Commonwealth Games as part of the swimming programme took place on 2 and 3 August at the Manchester Aquatics Centre in Manchester, England.

Records
Prior to this competition, the existing world, Commonwealth and Commonwealth Games records were as follows.

Results

Heats
Heats were held on 2 August.

Semifinals
The semifinals were held on 2 August.

Final
The final was held on 3 August.

References

Women's 100 metre breaststroke
Commonwealth Games
2002 in women's swimming